Otterslide Creek is a stream located entirely within Ritchie County, West Virginia.

Otterslide Creek was so named on account of otters sliding there.

See also
List of rivers of West Virginia

References

Rivers of Ritchie County, West Virginia
Rivers of West Virginia